Scheyern is a municipality  in the district of Pfaffenhofen in Bavaria in Germany. The Scheyern Abbey is located in Scheyern.

The title the counts of Scheyern originated here (see House of Wittelsbach).

The village of Fernhag lies just outside the town.

References

Pfaffenhofen (district)